East Compton  may refer to:
East Compton, California, USA
East Compton, Dorset, England
East Compton, Somerset, England